Fran Carlon (August 15, 1913 – October 4, 1993) was an American actress who was successful in radio, stage and screen.

Early years and theatre 

Carlon was born in Indianapolisand grew up in Chicago, She received her theatrical training at Chicago’s Goodman Theatre and later at the Pasadena Playhouse.

She began her stage career in the role of Little Eva in a touring production of Uncle Tom’s Cabin. Her first Broadway show, Play, Genius, Play, lasted only four performances. Her other Broadway credits included Sunrise at Campobello and Men of Distinction. She went to Hollywood where she appeared in films with Douglas Montgomery, Loretta Young and the Ritz Brothers.

Radio and television

Carlon "entered radio doing commercials on Amos 'n' Andy." Her radio roles included Martha in This Changing World, the reporter Lorelei Heilbron in Big Town, sister Sue in Big Sister, Rhoda Brent in Blackstone, the Magic Detective and Irene in Our Gal Sunday. She played the lead in Joan and Kermit, Kitty Keene, Mary Marlin and Joyce Jordan, M.D.. She was also in episodes of Mary Noble, Backstage Wife; Lora Lawton; Ma Perkins; The Chicago Theater of the Air; Mr. Keen, Tracer of Lost Persons and Theatre Five.

Her television roles included the series The Hamptons as Ada , As the World Turns as Julia Blake and Portia Faces Life as Portia Blake.

Personal life and death 

Carlon was married to Casey Allen, a radio actor and announcer, and had two children, a daughter, Kerry, and a son, Kim.

She died of cancer, aged 80, in 1993, in Manhattan, New York.

References

See also 
 List of radio soaps
 List of female detective characters

1913 births
1993 deaths
Actresses from Indianapolis
American stage actresses
American television actresses
American radio actresses
20th-century American actresses